Wyeth Flats, also known as the San Regis Apartments, is a historic apartment building located at St. Joseph, Missouri. It was built in 1888, and is a large four-story brick apartment building.  It originally contained multi-story townhouses and converted to an apartment building in the 1940s.

It was listed on the National Register of Historic Places in 1985.

References

Residential buildings on the National Register of Historic Places in Missouri
Residential buildings completed in 1888
Residential buildings in St. Joseph, Missouri
National Register of Historic Places in Buchanan County, Missouri